Đorđe Marković (Serbian Cyrillic: Ђорђе Марковић; born 20 September 1987 in Sarajevo) is a Serbian swimmer. At the 2012 Summer Olympics, he competed in the Men’s 400 metre freestyle, finishing in 23rd place in the heats, failing to reach the final.

References

External links
 
 
 
 

Serbian male swimmers
1987 births
Living people
Olympic swimmers of Serbia
Swimmers at the 2012 Summer Olympics